Wilczyce may refer to the following places in Poland:
Wilczyce, Legnica County in Lower Silesian Voivodeship (south-west Poland)
Wilczyce, Wrocław County in Lower Silesian Voivodeship (south-west Poland)
Wilczyce, Lesser Poland Voivodeship (south Poland)
Wilczyce, Świętokrzyskie Voivodeship (south-central Poland)
Wilczyce, Gmina Niegosławice in Lubusz Voivodeship (west Poland)